The (Hagelin) CD-57 was a portable, mechanical cipher machine manufactured by Crypto AG, first produced in 1957. It was derived from the earlier CD-55, and was designed to be compatible with the larger C-52 machines. Compact, the CD-57 measured merely 5 1/8in × 3 1/8in × 1 1/2in (13 × 8 × 3.8 cm) and weighed 1.5 pounds (680 gr). The CD-57 used six wheels.

A variant is the CD-57(RT), a similar device using a one-time pad system rather than rotating wheels. The STG-61 was a licensed copy of the CD-57 by Hell.

Sullivan (2002) shows how the CD-57 can be attacked using a hill climbing search technique.

See also
 M-209

Notes

References
 Wayne G. Baker, Solving a Hagelin, Type CD-57, Cipher, Cryptologia, 2(1), January 1978, pp1–8.
 Louis Kruh, Cipher Equipment: Hagelin Pocket Cryptographer, Type CD-57, Cryptologia, Volume 1, 1977, pp255–260.
 Geoff Sullivan, Cryptanalysis of Hagelin machine pin wheels, Cryptologia, 26(4), pp257–273, October 2002.

External links

 Photographs and a simulator (Windows)
 Jerry Proc's pages: , 
 Information about the STG-61

Encryption devices